The Empire Expo Center (also known as the New York State Fairgrounds) is an exhibition ground located in Geddes, a suburb of Syracuse, New York.

Its major annual event is the Great New York State Fair which draws approximately one million visitors during its 13-day run, and the entire complex is often referred to as the Fairgrounds. Its name comes from the nickname of New York State, "The Empire State". The State Fair Coliseum located within the Empire Expo Center was the original home of the Syracuse Nationals (now Philadelphia 76ers) professional basketball team.

Venues
Toyota Coliseum, Capacity 7,500
Originally known as the "State Fair Coliseum" until 2015, the venue is an indoor multipurpose arena. It was formerly the home of the Syracuse Nationals. It is now used for agricultural shows and the Tigris Shrine Circus. The Syracuse Stars hockey team played their games in the Coliseum and won the Calder Cup in the Inaugural Season of (what is now) the American Hockey League. The Midstate Stampede, a youth hockey team, also played in the Coliseum until the ice was removed around 2013. The Syracuse Hornets also played at the Coliseum, but due to financial troubles, the team folded after only 10 games.
Lakeview Amphitheater, Capacity, 17,500
Completed in 2015, it replaced the Mohegan Sun Grandstand as the primary concert venue.
Mohegan Sun Grandstand, Capacity: 17,000
Formerly known as the "New York State Fair Grandstand" until 2006. Was the main concert venue for the Great New York State Fair. In 2016, the grandstand was demolished. 
Chevy Court, Capacity: 2,500-35,000
Formerly known as "Cole Muffler Court". A festival setting stage that hosts free concerts during the fair. The venue will undergo a $4 million renovation in 2016. It will include new seating, landscaping and a bigger stage to draw big-name acts. Concerts will be organized by Live Nation Entertainment. 
Empire Theater
Theatre used for local acts, recitals, pageants and film screenings.  
Regional Artist Variety Stage
Formerly known as the "Special Events Stage", the stage hosts a variety of free entertainment spanning from comedy shows to music acts. All performers are from the New York State area. 
Grange Stage
Features country music acts, line dancers and cloggers.
Dairyland Stage
A small stage located in the Dairy Products building, providing an "open mic" for amateur acts.

Events
Annual events include:
 Great New York State Fair
 Syracuse International Horse Show
 Syracuse Jewelry & Mineral Show
 Syracuse Nationals (car show)
 New York State Boer Goat Show
 Autumn in New York Horse Show
 Salt City Autumn Antique Show
 The Great New York State Train Fair
 Syracuse Construction Career Day Fair

References

External links
 Empire Expo Center
 Event schedule

Convention centers in New York (state)
Buildings and structures in Syracuse, New York
Culture of Syracuse, New York
Tourist attractions in Onondaga County, New York
Onondaga Lake